Karl Cordin (born 3 November 1948) is an Austrian former alpine skier who did only compete in Downhill Races; he competed in the 1972 Winter Olympics, becoming 7th silver medal at FIS Alpine World Ski Championships 1970 in downhill.

Biography
Cording did win three World Cup races: on February 21, 1970, at Jackson Hole, on December 20th, 1970, at Val-d’Isère, and on December 18, 1973, at Zell am See; he did become five-times second and twice third too. He also could achieve the Downhill World Cup in 1969-70.
He won the silver medal in the FIS Alpine Skiing World Championships 1970 and became fourth in the FIS Alpine Skiing World Championships 1974; in both races he was overtaken by a racer with a higher number. In 1970, he was in lead (and it looked that he could gain the gold medal) - but Bernhard Russi did win. In 1974, he was on the way to win the bronze medal, but Willi Frommelt did catch it.

References

External links
 

1948 births
Living people
Austrian male alpine skiers
Olympic alpine skiers of Austria
Alpine skiers at the 1972 Winter Olympics
FIS Alpine Ski World Cup champions
People from Dornbirn
Sportspeople from Vorarlberg
20th-century Austrian people
21st-century Austrian people